Eunomia is a genus of moths in the subfamily Arctiinae erected by Jacob Hübner in 1818.

Species
Eunomia caymanensis Hampson, 1911
Eunomia colombina (Fabricius, 1793)
Eunomia insularis Grote, 1866
Eunomia latenigra (Butler, 1876)
Eunomia nitidula (Herrich-Schäffer, 1866)
Eunomia rubripunctata (Butler, 1876)

References

Arctiinae
Moth genera